Helen Oddveig Bjørnøy (born 18 February 1954 in Ålesund, Norway) is a Norwegian Lutheran minister and politician (Socialist Left Party), currently County Governor of Buskerud. From October 2005 to October 2007, she was Minister of the Environment in the Red-Green Coalition cabinet headed by Jens Stoltenberg. On 18 October 2007 she was relieved from her duties in the government and replaced by Erik Solheim (Socialist Left Party).

Biography 
Bjørnøy graduated from MF Norwegian School of Theology in 1980 and was ordained a minister in the Church of Norway the same year. She held a teaching position as assistant professor in the field of Ethics at Lovisenberg Deaconal University College from 1991 to 1999. Her last position before entering into government was Secretary General for the Church City Mission, Kirkens Bymisjon (1999–2005).

Bjørnøy suffered an illness in 2016, taking an indefinite leave as Buskerud's County Governor. In 2020, she was one of those who called for further review of a new biolaw being proposed in Norway. She has advocated for the recognition of children's rights and the protection of the female body. 

Bjørnøy is married to Tortein Lalim.

References
Norwegian government release
The Church City Mission

1954 births
Living people
MF Norwegian School of Theology, Religion and Society alumni
Ministers of Climate and the Environment of Norway
Socialist Left Party (Norway) politicians
Politicians from Ålesund
Norwegian priest-politicians
Women government ministers of Norway
20th-century Norwegian Lutheran clergy
20th-century Norwegian women politicians
20th-century Norwegian politicians
Women Lutheran clergy